Snake & Queen is the third full-length album from Japanese punk rock band 54 Nude Honeys, released on July 27, 2000.

Track listing

References

2000 albums
54 Nude Honeys albums